Walter Pearce may also refer to:
Walter Pearce (English cricketer)
Walter Pearce (New Zealand cricketer)
Walter Bryan Pearce, painter
Pard Pearce (Walter Irving Pearce), American football player
Walter Pearce, character in Comeback Season

See also
Walter Pierce (disambiguation)